Xenox is a genus of bee flies (insects in the family Bombyliidae). There are five described species in Xenox, all of which parasitize bees in the genus Xylocopa as larvae.

Species
 Xenox delila (Loew, 1869)
 Xenox habrosus (Marston, 1970)
 Xenox nigrita (Fabricius, 1775)
 Xenox tigrinus (De Geer, 1776) (tiger bee fly)
 Xenox xylocopae (Marston, 1970)

References

Further reading

External links

 

Bombyliidae genera
Articles created by Qbugbot